Home guard is a title given to various military organizations at various times, with the implication of an emergency or reserve force raised for local defense.

The term "home guard" was first officially used in the American Civil War, starting with units formed by German immigrants in Missouri, and may derive from possible historic use of the term Heimwehr ("home guard") to describe units officially known as Landwehr ("country guard"), or from an attempted translation of landwehr.

Military units

Active

Historical 
Aizsargi (Latvia, 1919–1940)
Home Guard (Unionist), during the American Civil War
Confederate Home Guard (1861–1865) during the American Civil War
Croatian Home Guard, several historic military formations during 19th and 20th century
Czechoslovak Home Guard (1918–1919)
Home Guard (Austria) (Heimwehr) (1920–1938) paramilitary unit of Fatherland Front Party
Home Guard (New Zealand) (1940–1943)
Home Guard (United Kingdom) (1940–1944)
Home Service Force, British force for the 1980s-90s.
Indian Home Guard, units raised from Indian tribes to support the Unionists in the American Civil War
Kikuyu Home Guard, a government paramilitary force in Kenya (1953–1955)
Lithuanian Riflemen's Union (1919–, unofficial since 1991)
Malayan Home Guard, auxiliary volunteer police forces in Malaya during Malayan Emergency
Narodnoe Opolcheniye
Slovene Home Guard (1943–1945)
Volkssturm Nazi Germany (1944-1945)
Volunteer Defence Corps (Australia) (1940-1944)

Similar Units
Civil Guard (disambiguation)
Home Army (Armia Krajowa), Poland, World War II
Fencibles, British temporary militias
Boeitai, a Japanese home guard force of World War II 
Local Defence troops (Finland)
Militia
Ordenanças, Portuguese home guard from 1570 to 1831
Omakaitse, Estonian Home Guard in World War II
State defense forces, home guards of individual U.S. states
United States Coast Guard Reserve "temporary reservists" during World War II
United States Guards
Wachdienst, an auxiliary organisation erected by the Third Reich in Germany during the last months of World War II

Other
Home Guard (Shannara), in Terry Brooks' novel series
Home Guard potato, a variety of first early potato

References

Military organization
Former disambiguation pages converted to set index articles